The Copa São Paulo de Futebol Júnior (or São Paulo Youth Football Cup, in English), also known as Copa São Paulo de Juniores (São Paulo Youth Cup) and Copinha (Little Cup), is a cup competition played by Brazilian under-20 association football teams (until the 2006 edition, it was contested by under-21 teams), most of them from São Paulo state. It is organized by the Paulista Football Federation and is considered one of the most traditional and important  under-20 sport competition in Brazil. Its final game is usually held on January 25, the anniversary of São Paulo City's founding.

Format

In the first stage, the 128 teams are divided in 32 groups. The top 2 of each group qualify to the knockout stage. The final is always played on 25 January, city of São Paulo foundation date. All matches are played in São Paulo state.

List of champions

(1) Currently named Paulista Futebol Clube.

(2) Currently named Grêmio Barueri Futebol Ltda..

Titles by team

Titles by state

Supercopa São Paulo de Futebol Júnior 
The Supercopa São Paulo de Futebol Júnior was a tournament organized by the São Paulo Football Federation bringing together 16 teams that until then had been champions and runners-up of the Copa São Paulo de Futebol Júnior and played by Brazilian under-20 football teams. 

It was held in 1994 and 1995.

List of Champions

Titles by team

Titles by state

References
 Website official 
 Copinha at Facebook
 Copinha at MyCujoo
 Copinha at Twitter
 Copinha at Instagram

Other 
 RSSSF Brasil
 Gazeta Esportiva
 Tudo pronto pro início da Copa São Paulo de Futebol Juniores - São Paulo City Government (January 2, 2007)

Youth football competitions in Brazil
Sao Paulo de Futebol Junior
Under-20 association football